William, Duke of Brunswick (25 April 1806 – 18 October 1884), was ruling duke of the Duchy of Brunswick from 1830 until his death.

William was the second son of Frederick William, Duke of Brunswick-Lüneburg, and after the death of his father in 1815, was under the guardianship of King George IV of the United Kingdom. He became a Prussian major in 1823. When his brother, Charles, was deposed as ruling duke by a rebellion in 1830, William took over the government provisionally. In 1831, a family law of the House of Guelph made William the ruling duke permanently. William left most government business to his ministers, spending most of his time at Oleśnica Castle in what is now southwestern Poland.

While William joined the Prussian-led North German Confederation in 1866, his relationship to Prussia was strained, since Prussia refused to recognize Ernest Augustus, Crown Prince of Hanover, his nearest male-line relative, as his heir, because of the Duke of Cumberland's claim to the throne of Hanover. William died in 1884; he passed on his private possessions to the Duke of Cumberland. His death caused a constitutional crisis for Brunswick that lasted until the accession of Ernest Augustus, Duke of Brunswick, the son of the Crown Prince of Hanover, in 1913.

William died unmarried, but had a number of illegitimate children.

Honours

References

 Meyers Konversationslexikon, 1889
 

|-

1806 births
1884 deaths
Dukes of Brunswick
House of Brunswick-Bevern
Members of the Prussian House of Lords
Nobility from Braunschweig
Protestant monarchs
German Lutherans
Prussian Army personnel
Grand Crosses of the Order of Saint Stephen of Hungary
Extra Knights Companion of the Garter
Burials at Brunswick Cathedral